Maria Spyraki (born 11 September 1965) is a member of the European Parliament (MEP) for Nea Dimokratia party - European People's Party (EPP), and a Greek journalist

Professional Experience
2014 – now: MEP, Nea Dimokratia party - European People's Party (EPP), European Parliament
2017-2019 and 2014-2015: Spokesperson, Nea Demokratia
2004-2009: Associate for Communication, Office of the EU Commissioner for Greece, Mr Stavros Dimas.
2003-2004: Journalist - European Parliament's Press Office
1990 – 2014: Journalist – political report, newspapers "Ependitis", "Exousia", "Thessaloniki", "Aggelioforos", "Imerisia tou Savvatou" and television networks SKAI, STAR, ALTER and MEGA

Academic qualifications 
MSc in Energy Law, Business, Regulation and Policy, International University of Greece
Chemistry Degree, Department of Chemistry, Aristotle University of Thessaloniki, Greece

Additional Information

Seminars – Vocational training

Summer classes - College of Europe, Bruges: 
Intensive Seminar on the EU, July 2014
Negotiations in Practice-Towards effective exercises with and within the EU, June 2015
Energy Union Summer School, June–July 2016

Lifelong programs - Vocational training centre, Kapodistrian University of Athens 
Crisis Management Consultant
Economic Crisis of 2010

Seminar 
Journalism and social media training course, London School of Journalism

Publications - Editor and book Author 
Circular Economy, Digital Transformation: Two Ways to Work with European Funding. Tziola Publications.
The Tomb of Amphipolis: An opportunity for the development of the region. Tziola Publications.

Honours and awards 
2019: MEP of the Year 2019 for Industry, Research and Innovation.
2019: Ambassador for Safe Internet (# SaferInternet4E)

Committees

Member 
Committee on Industry, Research, and Energy (ITRE)
Vice-Chair at Delegation for relations with the People's Republic of China

Substitute: 
Committee on the Environment, Public Health and Food Safety (ENVI)
Committee on Regional Development (REGI)
Delegation to the EU-North Macedonia Joint Parliamentary Committee

Memberships 
Writers' Union of Macedonia-Thrace

Language skills 
Greek (mother tongue)
English and French

References
 /www.mariaspyraki.eu

External links

  
 

1965 births
Living people
Politicians from Larissa
Alumni of the London School of Journalism
Aristotle University of Thessaloniki alumni
Greek women journalists
New Democracy (Greece) MEPs
MEPs for Greece 2014–2019
MEPs for Greece 2019–2024
21st-century women MEPs for Greece